Curculionichthys oliveirai is a species of catfish in the family Loricariidae. It is a freshwater species native to South America, where it occurs in tributaries of the Ivaí River in Brazil. The species reaches 3 cm (1.2 inches) SL and was named for Claudio Oliveira, a professor from São Paulo State University, Botucatu, São Paulo, after his contributions to the studies of Neotropical freshwater fishes.

References 

Loricariidae
Fish described in 2014